The William J. and John F. Kennedy College of Sciences at the University of Massachusetts Lowell is so named for the Kennedy family (unrelated to the political family) and their contributions to the campus. John F. Kennedy is an alumnus of the Lowell Technological Institute Class of 1970. The Lowell Technological Institute merged with the Lowell State College to become the University of Lowell in 1972. It joined the UMass system in 1991 to become Umass Lowell.

The William J. and John F. Kennedy College of Sciences at the University of Massachusetts Lowell comprises six departments: Biological Sciences, Chemistry, Computer Science, Environmental, Earth and Atmospheric Sciences, Mathematical Sciences, and Physics & Applied Physics.  The Dean of the Kennedy College of Sciences is Noureddine Melikechi, D.Phil.

History of the College 
College of Pure & Applied Science:   (date of creation unknown, possibly when Lowell Technological Institute was created in 1955) 

College of Arts & Sciences:  1992 to 1996
 The College of Arts & Sciences was created when the College of Pure & Applied Science and the College of Liberal Arts were merged. 

College of Arts & Sciences – Division of Sciences:  1996 to 2010

College of Arts & Sciences – Division of Fine Arts, Humanities and Social Sciences:  1996-2010 
 The College of Arts & Sciences was split into two Divisions within the College with Deans for each Division (Sciences:  Robert Tamarin; FAHSS: Nancy Kleniewski).  The College of Fine Arts was merged into the Division of Humanities and Social Sciences to form the Division of Fine Arts, Humanities and Social Sciences (maybe 1997.)

College of Sciences:  2010 to 2015
 The College of Arts & Sciences – Division of Sciences and the College of Arts & Sciences – Division of Fine Arts, Humanities and Social Sciences officially split in 2010 to form individual Colleges (the College of Sciences and the College of Fine Arts, Humanities and Social Sciences).

William J. and John F. Kennedy College of Sciences:  2015 to Present
  The College of Sciences was renamed in 2015 to be known as the William J. and John F. Kennedy College of Sciences. William J. Kennedy ’54 is the late older brother of John F. Kennedy ‘70.  Both are alumni of UMass Lowell’s predecessor college, Lowell Technological Institute.

History of the Deans

Departments

Biological Sciences 
The Department of Biological Sciences degree programs are Biology, Bioinformatics, Biotechnology and Ecology, as well as the option to minor in biological sciences. Dr. Michael Graves is the interim chair of the department. The department has more than 20 professors and lecturers.

Chemistry 
The Department of Chemistry trains students to be technical chemists as well as allowing them to explore research pathways. The department offers bachelors, masters, and doctorate degrees. Chemistry students pursuing a bachelor's degree have the option to focus in Forensic Science, Biochemistry, and Gereral Chemistry. General Chemistry, Environmental Chemistry, Biochemistry, and Polymer Science are different specializations of graduate degrees.

Dr. David Ryan is the chair of the department and specializes in Analytical and Environmental Chemistry.  The Chemistry Department has 20+ faculty as well as 150 undergraduate students and 100 graduate students.

Computer science 
The Department of Computer Science offers bachelors, masters, and doctorate degree programs and is also home to a Robotics minor program. General Computer Science, Cybersecurity, Data Science, and Bio-Cheminformatics are different conventrations the department provides. Prior knowledge of programing is not required in this major.

The chair of the department is Dr. Haim Levkowitz, who focuses on graphics, imaging and user interfaces.

Environmental, Earth and Atmospheric Sciences 
The Department of Environmental, Earth and Atmospheric Sciences (EEAS for short) focuses on earth sciences such as Meteorology, Environmental Studies and Geology. The Department Chair is Dr. Daniel Obrist, appointed in 2017. Dr. Obrist focuses on environmental pollution and atmospheric science.

Mathematical Sciences 
Dr. Tibor Beke is the chair of the department. Some of the concentrations in the math department include Applied and Computational Mathematics, Business Applications, Statistics, Bioinformatics, and a teaching option. A doctorate program in Computational Mathematics is provided which is also a part of the Computer Science department.

Physics and Applied Physics 
The Physics Department has bachelors, master, and doctorate degree pathways. The degree concentrations provided are General Physics, Astronomy, Photonics, and Radiological Health Sciences. In 2016 a professor from the department and the Dean launched a satellite to Mars with NASA. UMass Lowell's research nuclear reactor has done work with NASA, the army and many private high tech companies. The chair of the Department is Dr. Robert Giles, who specializes in experimental laser physics and optics.

Research Centers and Specialized Laboratories 
The New England Robotics Validation and Experimentation Center provides a research, testing and training facility to academic researchers and corporations who work with robotics. Some partnerships include iRobot, Google, and NASA.

The Space Science Lab conducts experimental and analytical research to provide scholars and companies with information regarding the atmosphere and space sciences.

The UML Submillimeter Wave Technology Lab uses terahertz radar technology to create 3D scattering and imaging solutions to sponsors.

References

University of Massachusetts Lowell
University subdivisions in Massachusetts